The Willaumez Peninsula is located on the north coast of New Britain in the West New Britain Province. It was named after Jean-Baptiste Philibert Willaumez by Antoine Bruni d'Entrecasteaux.

West New Britain Province
Peninsulas of Papua New Guinea